Jesus Partida (born November 29, 1998) is an American soccer player who currently plays as a midfielder for USL League One club Central Valley Fuego.

Career

Youth & college
Partida attended high school at Sparks High School in Nevada, where he was the 3A state tournament MVP after helping Sparks to the state championship title his senior season. He also helped the team to win a pair of conference and regional championships, and was a two-time first team all-league and all-state selection. Partida also played club soccer for Sagebrush United between 2011 and 2017.

In 2017, Partida attended the University of Nevada, Las Vegas to play college soccer. During his time with the Rebels, Partida made 65 appearances, scoring nine goals and tallying five assists. He redshirted the 2019 season due to injury, and the 2020 season was truncated due to the COVID-19 pandemic. In 2017, he was named All-WAC Freshman Team.

Central Valley Fuego
On April 21, 2022, Partida signed with USL League One club Central Valley Fuego FC. He made his professional debut on April 30, 2022, appearing as a half-time substitute during a 1–0 win over Forward Madison FC, where he scored the game-winning goal with a 40-yard strike.

References

External links

1998 births
Living people
American soccer players
Association football midfielders
Central Valley Fuego FC players
People from Sparks, Nevada
Soccer players from Nevada
UNLV Rebels men's soccer players
USL League One players